Abū al-Ḥakam ʿAbd al-Salām b. ʿAbd al Raḥmān b. Abī al-Rijāl Muḥammad b. ʿAbd al-Raḥmān al-Lakhmī al-Ifrīqī al-Ishbīlī (Arabic: عبد السلام بن عبد الرحمن بن محمد بن  برجان اللخمي) (born in Seville where he lived, he died in Marrakesh 1141) was an Arab Sufi figure of Al-Andalus, considered to be one of the greatest Sufi masters and hadith scholars. He spread his teachings in the first half of the 12th century.

Works
Ibn Barrajan wrote a two-volume commentary on the names of Allah, two famous tafseers, Idah al-hikma bi Ahkam al-'Ibra Wisdom Deciphered The Unseen Discovered, which exists in a critical edition. and Tanbih al-Afham Ila Tadabbur al-Kitab al-Hakim wa Ta'arruf al-Ayat wa-l-Naba al-'Athim, which is currently printed in 3 editions. Ibn Barrajan is most famous for his prediction of the conquering of Jerusalem from the crusaders by Salahudeen Ayyubi, only being a few days off. His writings had a great influence on Ibn Arabi who was quite sceptical of Ibn Barrajan's methods of prognostication of the Jerusalem conquest calling them 'Ilm al-Huruf.

Death
He died in prison in Marrakesh, when he was summoned to that city by the Almoravid sultan who feared his influence. Against the wishes of the sultan he received an official burial on the initiative of Ibn Harzihim.

See also

 List of Ash'aris and Maturidis

References

Sarh Asma' Allah Al-Husna: Comentario Sobre Los Nombres Mas Bellos De Dios Ibn Barrajan, Abd al-Salam ibn Abd al-Rahman ibn Muhammad;  Madrid, 2000.  571pp. .
Paul Nwiya, "Notes sur quelques fragments inédits de la correspondence d'Ibn al-'Arif avec Ibn Barrajan"in Hesperis 43 (1956)
A. Faure, entry "Ibn Barradjan" in: N. Hanif, Biographical encyclopaedia of Sufis: Africa and Europe, Sarup & Sons, 2002, p. 64-65  (retrieved 3-12-2010)

1141 deaths
12th-century jurists
Sufis from al-Andalus
Hadith scholars
Maliki scholars from al-Andalus
12th-century writers from al-Andalus
Year of birth unknown
Saladin
People who died in prison custody
Writers under the Almoravid dynasty